Wilder Ranch State Park is a California State Park on the Pacific Ocean coast north of Santa Cruz, California. The park was formerly a dairy ranch, and many of the ranch buildings have been restored for use as a museum. There are no campgrounds; a day-use parking lot provides access to the museum. Dogs are prohibited on the trails, but many trails allow bikes and/or horses. The long trails and ocean views make the area a favorite of hikers, equestrians and mountain bikers. Public beaches continue to the north in Coast Dairies State Park.

History
The first European land exploration of Alta California, the Spanish Portolà expedition, followed the coast in this area on its way north, camping at today's Majors Creek (now the northern park boundary) on October 18, 1769. On its way through today's Santa Cruz County, the explorers bestowed a few important names which survive today: Pajaro River, San Lorenzo River and Santa Cruz. On the return journey to San Diego, the party camped at the same spot on November 21. Franciscan missionary Juan Crespi noted in his diary the difficulty of moving along this part of the coast: "The road on this march was very troublesome, on account of the frequent gulches [arroyos] along the way."

When Mission Santa Cruz was established in 1791, the area became part of the mission pasture lands. Secularization of the missions in 1834 divided the mission lands into large land grants called "ranchos". Wilder Ranch was part of Rancho Refugio, a Mexican land grant of 1839. Historic buildings include part of the adobe rancho house built around that time by rancho grantee Jose Bolcoff.

Dairyman Delos D. Wilder, in partnership with L. K. Baldwin, acquired part of the former rancho in 1871. In 1885, the partners split the holdings into separate ranches. Most of both ranches are now contained within the park. Among the historic ranch buildings, the older farmhouse predate the Wilders. The oldest part of it was built in the 1850s. Wilder's elegant 1897 Victorian home also survives. The Wilder family continued to operate the dairy until 1969, and the state acquired the land in 1974. Since then, the Bolcoff adobe, two Wilder houses and several other ranch structures have been restored for use as a museum.

Gray Whale Ranch
In 1996 the state acquired the adjacent "Gray Whale Ranch". The  parcel contains many long trails, extending from the northern boundary of Wilder Ranch to the University of California at Santa Cruz campus. The addition of "Gray Whale Ranch", plus more recent additions, results in a park totaling  that extends  up-slope from the coast and creates a swath of publicly owned land from the shore all the way to the town of Felton. The main ranch road (dirt) extends through Wilder Ranch to the Pacific Ocean coast, and in the other direction connects to a fire road on the U.C.S.C. campus.

The former "Gray Whale Ranch" also contains the ruins of a lime manufacturing operation, including a quarry and lime kilns built by early lime manufacturer Samuel Adams in the mid-19th century. The ranch and lime works were later acquired by industrialist Henry Cowell.

Spelunking is one popular activity on "Gray Whale Ranch", although most cavers try to prevent the location of the caves from becoming widely known. The main cave frequented by spelunkers is known as "Hell Hole"; the main destination inside is the "Hall of Faces", a clay room where people leave sculptures and sign a book.  Getting to the Hall of Faces is no easy task, and requires descending the 90 foot (27 m) vertical called "The Pit".  Barricades are periodically placed in the caves to prevent entry, but these barriers are typically removed fairly quickly.

The "Gray Whale Ranch" had been zoned only for logging but was considered for further development before the Save the Redwoods League, a private conservation group, bought the land in 1996 for $13.4 million and transferred it to the State Parks Department. The California Coastal Conservancy and the state California Wildlife Conservation Board (California Department of Fish and Wildlife), each contributed to help State Parks acquire the property for just over $1 million.

Marine protected area
Natural Bridges State Marine Reserve is a marine protected area along the coast of Wilder Ranch State Park and part of the adjacent Natural Bridges State Beach. The long, narrow Reserve area is bounded by the mean high tide line and a distance of 200 feet seaward of mean lower low water. This protected area helps conserve ocean tidal-zone wildlife and marine ecosystems.

Notes

External links
Wilder Ranch State Park 
 Park map
 Trail information
Santa Cruz County Birding Guide - Gray Whale Ranch

State parks of California
Parks in Santa Cruz County, California
Protected areas of Santa Cruz County, California
Protected areas established in 1974
1974 establishments in California